Álvaro Vázquez García (born 27 April 1991) is a Spanish professional footballer who plays as a striker for Indian Super League club FC Goa.

Club career

Spain and Swansea City
Born in Barcelona, Catalonia, Vázquez spent most of his life in Badalona. He joined RCD Espanyol's youth system in 2005 at the age of 14, and four years later he made his senior debut, appearing with the reserves in Segunda División B and suffering relegation.

Vázquez made his first-team – and La Liga – debut on 21 September 2010, coming on as a substitute for Sergio García midway through the second half of a 3–0 away loss to Real Madrid. Only five days later, he scored the game's only goal in a home fixture against CA Osasuna, and remained with the main squad for the rest of the season, mainly acting as backup to Dani Osvaldo.

After Osvaldo departed for A.S. Roma in summer 2011, Vázquez was made starter by manager Mauricio Pochettino. In January 2012, over only four days, he scored four goals in two games: first, he equalised through a header in the last minutes of the local derby against FC Barcelona (1–1 home draw), then added a hat-trick to help defeat Córdoba CF in the round of 16 of the Copa del Rey (4–2 home win, 5–4 on aggregate).

After spending the 2012–13 campaign with fellow league side Getafe CF, Vázquez became coach Michael Laudrup's eighth Spanish signing for his Swansea City team on 2 September 2013, with the loan move being subject to international clearance. He made his Premier League debut on the 22nd in a 2–0 away victory over Crystal Palace, setting up Nathan Dyer for the second goal.

Vázquez returned to his first club Espanyol on 31 August 2016 after agreeing to a four-year contract. On 11 January 2018, after being rarely used, he was loaned to Gimnàstic de Tarragona of Segunda División for six months.

On 23 August 2018, Vázquez joined fellow second-division team Real Zaragoza on a one-year loan. Upon returning, he terminated his contract with Espanyol on 18 June 2019 and signed a three-year deal with Sporting de Gijón on 10 July.

Vázquez moved to second-tier CE Sabadell FC on 12 January 2021, on loan for the remainder of the season.

Kerala Blasters
On 30 August 2021, Vázquez signed a one-year contract with Kerala Blasters FC. He made his debut in the Indian Super League on 19 November, losing 4–2 at ATK Mohun Bagan FC. He scored his first goal for the club on 5 December in the 2–1 home defeat of Odisha FC, repeating the feat the following week against SC East Bengal (1–1) and also having a goal disallowed early on. He scored for the third consecutive match on 19 December, doubling the lead against defending champions Mumbai City FC in an eventual 3–0 win; he was voted player of the match for his performance in the latter. 

On 4 February 2022, Vázquez netted from behind the half-line (59 meters) against NorthEast United FC, which proved crucial to a 2–1 victory. His side reached the season's final, losing to Hyderabad FC on penalties.

Vázquez left the Blasters in May 2022.

Goa
In April 2022, it was reportedly agreed that Vázquez would join FC Goa as a free agent. On 24 June, the player agreed to a two-year deal.

International career
Vázquez represented Spain at the 2011 FIFA U-20 World Cup in Colombia. He finished the competition with five goals (tied with Henrique of eventual champions Brazil), as the nation reached the quarter-finals.

Also in 2011, Vázquez made his debut for the under-21 team. He helped them win the 2013 UEFA European Championship by scoring in his only appearance, the 3–0 group stage win against the Netherlands.

Career statistics

Honours
Spain U21
UEFA European Under-21 Championship: 2013

Individual
FIFA U-20 World Cup Silver Shoe: 2011

References

External links

1991 births
Living people
Spanish footballers
Footballers from Barcelona
Association football forwards
La Liga players
Segunda División players
Segunda División B players
Tercera División players
CF Damm players
RCD Espanyol B footballers
RCD Espanyol footballers
Getafe CF footballers
Gimnàstic de Tarragona footballers
Real Zaragoza players
Sporting de Gijón players
CE Sabadell FC footballers
Premier League players
Swansea City A.F.C. players
Indian Super League players
Kerala Blasters FC players
FC Goa players
Spain youth international footballers
Spain under-21 international footballers
Spain under-23 international footballers
Catalonia international footballers
Spanish expatriate footballers
Expatriate footballers in Wales
Expatriate footballers in India
Spanish expatriate sportspeople in Wales
Spanish expatriate sportspeople in India